Intesa Sanpaolo Bank Albania was created in 2008 from the merger of two important Banks of the country Banca Italo-Albanese (founded in 1993) and the American Bank of Albania (founded in 1998), both acquired from Intesa Sanpaolo Group.

History

American Bank of Albania
ABA was established in September 1998, by the Albanian-American Enterprise Fund (AAEF) a private investment fund established by the United States government under the SEED Act of 1989, to assist Albania in its transition to a market economy. As at 30 December 2007, ABA had total deposits of LEK 93.4 billion, total loans of over LEK 39.7 billion, and total assets of over LEK 106.4 billion. On the 20th and 21 December 2006, AAEF, ABA’s sole shareholder, signed a Share Purchase Agreement and a Shareholder Agreement for the sale of 80% stake of the shares outstanding, with AAEF maintaining control of the other 20% stake, until 2009. The agreement was finalized on 29 June 2007, when ABA officially became a bank of Intesa Sanpaolo Group.

Banca Italo-Albanese
Banca Italo-Albanese was established in July 1993 as one of the first private banks in Albania. It was established as a joint venture between the National Commercial Bank of Albania (shares were transferred to Ministry of Finance) and the Italian Banca di Roma. On 7 December 2005, Sanpaolo IMI signed the agreement for the acquisition of a stake of 80% in Banca Italo Albanese, from Capitalia and the Ministry of Finance (40% each). The European Bank for Reconstruction and Development (20%) retained its stake.

External links

Intesa Sanpaolo Bank Albania Official Site
Intesa Sanpaolo Bank Albania SWIFT Codes

Banks of Albania
Intesa Sanpaolo subsidiaries
2008 establishments in Albania
Banks established in 2008